The list of ship launches in 1799 includes a chronological list of some ships launched in 1799.


References

1799
Ship launches